The name Orchid has been used for five tropical cyclones in the Western Pacific basin.
 (1980)  
 (1983)
 (1987)
 (1991)
 (1994)

Pacific typhoon set index articles